Ichisho Inuma (February 15, 1892 – November 14, 1982) was a Japanese politician who served as governor of Hiroshima Prefecture from November 1938 to September 1939. He was a graduate of the University of Tokyo. He was also the governor of Saitama Prefecture (1934–1935), Shizuoka Prefecture (1937–1938) and Kanagawa Prefecture (1939–1940).

Legacy 
In his prefecture, he is taught as a right and decent example of a state official and often revered well.

References 

Governors of Hiroshima
1892 births
1982 deaths
Japanese Home Ministry government officials
Governors of Saitama Prefecture
Governors of Shizuoka Prefecture
Governors of Kanagawa Prefecture
University of Tokyo alumni